The 2011 NHL Premiere was the National Hockey League's fifth European multi-game event to open the regular season, featuring the Anaheim Ducks, the Buffalo Sabres, the Los Angeles Kings and the New York Rangers. It took place on October 7–8, 2011, to open the 2011–12 NHL season. Preceding this, as with previous Premiere events, the NHL teams participated in a series of exhibition games with European teams as part of the 2011 NHL Premiere Challenge, between September 29 and October 4, 2011. 

Later on in the season, a contingent of Adler Mannheim fans would embark on their own tour of hockey games in Buffalo and Toronto, with the backing of the Sabres and the Toronto Maple Leafs.

NHL Premiere Challenge

Game one

Game two

Game three

Game four

Game five

Game six

Game seven

NHL Premiere

Game one

Game two

Game three

Game four

References

Pre
NHL